Buckshot Racing is a former NASCAR team owned by Billy Jones and competed in the Winston Cup and Busch Series. The team compiled a total of four wins throughout its history.

The team debuted in 1995 with Jones' son Buckshot driving. Jones made his debut at The Milwaukee Mile with Longhorn Steakhouse sponsorship. Jones ran a total of nine races that season, finishing ninth at South Boston Speedway.  The following season, they ran a total of eighteen races with Aquafresh sponsoring. Jones won his first career race at Milwaukee and a pole at North Carolina Speedway, finishing 25th in the final points.  He failed to win another race in 1997, but he finished a career-best seventh in points, and made his Winston Cup debut at Atlanta Motor Speedway.  The team qualified 32nd but finished last due to a wreck by Jones early in the race.

In 1998, Bayer/Alka-Seltzer became the team's new primary sponsor, and Jones picked up his second career win at the Gumout Long Life Formula 200, but dropped to ninth in points.  Buckshot Racing also ran five Cup races under a partnership with Stavola Brothers Racing, and had an eighth-place finish at Dover International Speedway.  Jones moved up to Winston Cup full-time in 1999, racing the 00 but without major sponsorship.  Larry Pearson replaced him in the team's Busch Series operation, with Cheez-It sponsorship.  Jones struggled running the Cup series, and after several DNQs, he left Cup to replace Pearson in the Busch car, who had only one top-ten finish. Jones had two tenth-place finishes out of nineteen starts.  In 2000, Jones won his final pole at Michigan International Speedway and improved to 21st in the standings.

Jones returned to Cup for Petty Enterprises in 2001, and Todd Bodine was hired as the team's new driver.  Despite driving without major sponsorship and switching to Chevrolet, Bodine won two of the first three races of the season.  When sponsorship forced the team to cut back to a part-time schedule, Buckshot and Tim Fedewa returned to drive a limited races with Georgia Pacific funding, posting four top-ten finishes between them.  Jason Schuler also drove the No. 04 for a pair of races, his best finishes of 36th.  The lack of funding caused Buckshot to sell the team in 2002.

External links 
 Billy Jones Winston Cup Owner Stats at Racing-Reference.info

Auto racing teams established in 1995
Auto racing teams disestablished in 2002
Defunct NASCAR teams
American auto racing teams